Henry Logan Stollenwerck, Jr. (December 6, 1930 – March 2, 2021) was a Republican member of the Texas House of Representatives in the 58th Texas Legislature from January 1963 to January 1965. He is best known, during his legislative tenure, for having proposed the ratification of the Corwin Amendment, more than a century after Congress passed it in 1861.

During the 1964 Texas gubernatorial election he attempted to convince state Representative Horace Houston to run for the Republican gubernatorial nomination, but he chose to be the nominee for lieutenant governor and Jack Crichton was selected as governor instead.

References 

1930s births
2021 deaths
Republican Party members of the Texas House of Representatives
20th-century American politicians